The Garden of Earthly Delights (Ogród rozkoszy ziemskich) is a 2004 film by the Polish director Lech Majewski. It follows two lovers as they roam Venice, Italy.

Plot
Claudine is a British art scholar who has a terminal case of throat cancer. She is in Venice to give a lecture on the Bosch triptych from which the film gets its name.

Claudine is accompanied in Venice by her lover, Chris, a nautical engineer. Together they explore the canals of Venice. Chris has brought his video camera, and the audience watches Claudine and Chris hang out, make love, swim, converse, rent an apartment, and recreate vignettes from the triptych.

Cast
 Claudine Spiteri as Claudine
 Chris Nightingale as Chris
 Barry Chipperfield as National Gallery Warder
 Maria Novella Martinoli as Real Estate Agent
 Gian Campi as Professor Carrini
 Mariosa Marchiori as Woman in Black
 Lucrezia Unterholzner as Child

Evaluation
Ágnes Pethő suggests that the tableau vivant performances by the lovers to recreate images from the Bosch artwork break down the differences between and to celebrate art and life.

References

External links
 Official Site 
 
 Lee, Nathan. (2006, June 22). "Asking the Great Questions While Lounging About Venice". The New York Times, p. B6

2004 films
Films directed by Lech Majewski
English-language Italian films
Polish romance films
2004 romantic drama films
Films set in Venice
2000s English-language films